Mohamed El Mehdi Boukassi (born 15 June 1996) is an Algerian professional footballer who plays as a midfielder for FC Haka on loan from Raja CA. Previously he has played in Portugal and Bulgaria as well.

In February 2021, Boukassi signed with Torpedo Kutaisi and was presented as a new player of the club.

References

External links
 

1993 births
Living people
Algerian footballers
Liga Portugal 2 players
First Professional Football League (Bulgaria) players
U.D. Oliveirense players
PFC Cherno More Varna players
Algerian expatriate sportspeople in Portugal
Algerian expatriate sportspeople in Bulgaria
Expatriate footballers in Portugal
Expatriate footballers in Bulgaria
Association football midfielders
Paradou AC players
USM Bel Abbès players
21st-century Algerian people